Van den Hoek is a Dutch toponymic surname meaning "from the corner". Variations on the name include Van Hoek, Van der Hoek, Van den Hoeck, Van den Hoecke, and concatenated forms of these. The surname Verhoek is a contraction of "Van der Hoek". People with these surnames include:

Van den Hoek
Aad van den Hoek (born 1951), Dutch racing cyclist
Arnold van den Hoek (1921–1945), Dutch chess player
Bianca van den Hoek (born 1976), Dutch racing cyclist
Cornelis Pieter van den Hoek (1921–2015), Dutch World War II resistance fighter
Leanne van den Hoek (born 1958), Dutch army officer
 (born 1957), Dutch classical pianist 

Van der Hoek

See Van der Hoek.

Van den Hoeck
 (1700–1750), Dutch founder of the German scholarly publishing house Vandenhoeck & Ruprecht
Van den Hoecke
Gaspar van den Hoecke (c. 1585–after 1648), Flemish still life painter
Jan van den Hoecke (1611–1651), Flemish painter and draughtsman, son of Gaspar
Robert van den Hoecke (1622–1668), Flemish battle scenes painter, son of Gaspar
Van Hoek
 (born 1947), Dutch painter and woodcarver
John Van Hoek (born 1952), Australian judoka
Lotte van Hoek (born 1991), Dutch racing cyclist

See also
 Hoek (surname), Dutch surname of the same origin
 Hoek (disambiguation)

References

Dutch-language surnames
Surnames of Dutch origin
Dutch toponymic surnames